The Woman Disputed is a 1928 American silent film. Norma Talmadge stars as a good-hearted Austrian prostitute drawn into a romantic triangle on the eve of World War I. Based on a Denison Clift play, the nationalities of the characters had to be adjusted to satisfy official complaints registered with the MPPDA from the German government.

Released with a soundtrack of effects and synchronized music, this film is the end of Talmadge's career in silent films. She was separated from her husband and producer Schenck, would take the next year for vocal lessons, appear in two talking films, then retire. A print exists in the Library of Congress film archive, and has been recently revived.

The plot draws in part on the 1880 short story "Boule de Suif" by French writer Guy de Maupassant.

Cast
 Norma Talmadge as Mary Ann Wagner
 Gilbert Roland as Paul Hartman
 Arnold Kent as Nika Turgenov
 Boris de Fast as Passerby
 Michael Vavitch as Father Roche
 Gustav von Seyffertitz as Otto Krueger
 Gladys Brockwell as Countess
 Nicholas Soussanin as Count

References

External links

original New York Times review

1928 films
American romantic drama films
American silent feature films
American black-and-white films
Films about prostitution in Austria
Films based on Boule de Suif
World War I films set on the Eastern Front
Films set in Austria
Films set in Poland
Films set in Ukraine
Films set in the 1910s
Transitional sound films
Films produced by Joseph M. Schenck
1928 romantic drama films
Films directed by Henry King
Films directed by Sam Taylor
1920s American films
Silent romantic drama films
Silent American drama films